Domingo Valdivieso y Henarejos (30 August 1830 – 22 November 1872) was a Spanish painter and engraver in the Academic style.

Biography
Valdivieso was born in Mazarrón, where his father was an officer in the Spanish Army. He began his education in his home town, but later moved to Murcia to pursue his secondary studies. While there, he displayed a notable talent for drawing, so his counselors advised him to pursue artistic studies as well. His first teacher was a local artist named Juan Albacete.  At eighteen, he moved to Madrid to work for the government, but also attended the Real Academia de Bellas Artes de San Fernando in his spare time.

By 1853, he had firmly decided on a career as a painter and quit his position. In 1861, he received a grant from the Diputación de Murcia to complete his studies in Paris and Rome, where he came under the influence of Eduardo Rosales and the Nazarene movement.

From there, he participated in the National Exhibition of Fine Arts, winning medals in 1862, 1864 and 1866, the year he became a Professor of anatomical painting at the San Fernando Academy. In 1871, he was awarded another medal at the Exhibition.

His best-known works deal with religious subjects, although he also created historical scenes, portraits, mythological scenes and costumbrista works; depicting Italy and Murcia.

He died in Madrid, aged only forty-two, from a cerebral inflammation.

References

Further reading 
Juan Antonio López Delgado, Domingo Valdivieso, pintor, Author-editor, 2009

External links 

 More works by Valdivieso @ the Biblioteca Digital Hispánica.

1830 births
1872 deaths
19th-century Spanish painters
Spanish male painters
Religious artists
Spanish engravers
Spanish illustrators
People from Mazarrón
19th-century Spanish male artists